"Heritage of Anger" was an American television play broadcast on November 15, 1956, as part of the CBS television series, Playhouse 90. It was the seventh episode of the series.

Plot
Industrialist Eddie Hanneman learns that his sons do not wish to take over the business that he has built. Son John Ericson aspires to be a jet pilot. However, his sales manager, Paul Fletcher, does wish to take over the business.

Cast
The cast included performances by:
 Ralph Bellamy as Eddie Hanneman
 Nina Foch as Libby Hanneman
 Lloyd Bridges as Paul Fletcher
 John Ericson as Johnny Hanneman
 Tom Brown as Arthur Hanneman
 Onslow Stevens as Sidney Lennox

Kay Thompson hosted the program.

Production
The play was staged at CBS Television City in Los Angeles. It was directed by Vincent J. Donehue. The teleplay was written by Harold Jack Bloom.

Reception
In The New York Times, J. P. Shanley called it "an engrossing study" that "moved swiftly and absorbingly to an exciting and believable climax." Shanley also praised Bloom for "an expertly constructed script"  Donehue for "fine direction", and Bellamy, Ericson, Foch, and Bridges for "outstanding portrayals."

In The Boston Globe, Mary Cremmen called it "arresting drama" "admirably executed".

References

1956 American television episodes
Playhouse 90 (season 1) episodes
1956 television plays